The Mehmed Paša Sokolović Bridge is a historic bridge in Višegrad, over the Drina River in eastern  Bosnia and Herzegovina. It was completed in 1577 by the Ottoman court architect Mimar Sinan on the order of the Grand Vizier Mehmed Paša Sokolović. UNESCO included the bridge in its 2007 World Heritage List.

Characteristics
It is characteristic of the apogee of Turkish monumental architecture and civil engineering. It numbers 11 masonry arches, with spans of 11 to 15 meters, and an access ramp at right angles with four arches on the left bank of the river. 

The  bridge is a representative masterpiece of Mimar Sinan, one of the greatest architects and engineers of the classical Ottoman period and a contemporary of the Italian Renaissance, with which his work can be compared. The UNESCO summary states: The unique elegance of proportion and monumental nobility of the property as a whole bear witness to the greatness of this style of architecture.

History

The Višegrad Bridge was commissioned by Grand Vizier Mehmed Pasha Sokolović, who exercised power over a long period at the summit of the Ottoman Empire during the reign of three sultans as a tribute to his native region and a symbol of trade and prosperity. Construction of the bridge took place between 1571 and 1577. Major renovations of the bridge have taken place in 1664, 1875, 1911, 1940 and 1950–52. Three of its 11 arches were destroyed during World War I and five were damaged during World War II but subsequently restored.

Renovation
The bridge received UNESCO World Heritage Listing in 2007.

The Turkish International Co-operation and Development Agency (TIKA) provided 3.5 million euros for the restoration of the Mehmed Paša Sokolović Bridge. Representatives of TIKA, the BiH Commission for Co-operation with UNESCO, the Republika Srpska Cultural Ministry and the Višegrad municipality signed an agreement to renovate the bridge on 19 April 2010.

Site of a massacre

During the Bosnian War the bridge was a site of mass murder of Bosnian Muslims, and it served as a dumping point for the bodies of murdered Bosniaks which were thrown into the Drina River.

In literature
The bridge is widely known because of the book The Bridge on the Drina (1945) written by Yugoslav writer Ivo Andrić, Nobel Prize–winning author.

See also 
 List of World Heritage Sites in Bosnia and Herzegovina
Višegrad massacres

References

External links

Mehmed Paša Sokolović Bridge, visegradturizam.com
Mehmed Paša Sokolović Bridge, official promo video 2019, youtube.com
 UNESCO listing of Mehmed Paša Sokolović Bridge in Višegrad, whc.unesco.org

Ottoman bridges in Bosnia and Herzegovina
Deck arch bridges
Architecture in Bosnia and Herzegovina
World Heritage Sites in Bosnia and Herzegovina
Bridges completed in 1577
Višegrad
Mimar Sinan buildings
Buildings and structures in Republika Srpska
1577 establishments in Europe
Medieval Bosnia and Herzegovina architecture